Huai Mek is a district (amphoe) in the western part of Kalasin province, northeastern Thailand.

Geography
Neighboring districts are (from the northeast clockwise): Nong Kung Si and Yang Talat of Kalasin Province; Chuen Chom of Maha Sarakham province; and Kranuan of Khon Kaen Province.

History
The minor district (king amphoe) was created on 1 November 1970, when the three tambons, Huai Mek, Kut Don, and Bueng Na Riang were split off from Yang Talat district. It was upgraded to a full district on 12 April 1977.

Administration
The district is divided into nine sub-districts (tambons), which are further subdivided into 81 villages (mubans). There are two townships (thesaban tambons): Huai Mek and Kham Yai each cover parts of the same-named tambon. There are a further nine tambon administrative organizations (TAO).

References

External links
amphoe.com

Huai Mek